Kauriaganj is a small town and a nagar panchayat in Aligarh district in the Indian state of Uttar Pradesh.

Demographics
At the 2001 India census, Kauriaganj had a population of 10,581 (males 53%, females 47%). Kauriaganj has an average literacy rate of 41% (males 50%, females 31%), lower than the national average of 59.5%. 21% of the population was under 6 years of age.

Notable people
The Hindi writer Jainendra Kumar (1905-1988) was born here.

Nearby cities 
Khair
Kasganj
Aligarh

References

Cities and towns in Aligarh district